Alan Hunt (born 1925 Aston, England - died 2 February 1957) was an international motorcycle speedway rider  who qualified for the Speedway World Championship final four times.

Career
Hunt attended Tiger Stevensons training school in the winter of 1946-47 and impressed so much he was given the reserve berth with the Cradley Heath Cubs for the 1947 season who were competing in the National League Division Three. After his fourth season with the Heathens, Hunt was averaging over ten points per meeting and it was not surprising that he was attracting the attention of top-flight teams. 

In 1951, the Harringay Racers thought they had a deal with the Heathens to sign Hunt on a full transfer but at the last moment the Birmingham Brummies promotion took over the Heathens and transferred Hunt to them.

In his first season at Birmingham he qualified for the World Final but only manage two points. It signalled the start of his dislike of the Wembley track although it was similar to the Cradley Heath track he learnt his speedway skills on. 

Hunt was also selected to ride for England, the highlight being a six ride, six win maximum against Australia in 1956.

World Final appearances
 1951 -  London, Wembley Stadium - 16th - 2pts
 1953 -  London, Wembley Stadium - 14th - 3pts
 1954 -  London, Wembley Stadium - Res - Did not ride
 1956 -  London, Wembley Stadium - 11th - 6pts

Death
On 1 February 1957 Hunt was riding in a meeting in South Africa, where he was planning on emigrating and only living in the UK during the speedway season, when he fell and was hit by the machine of the following rider, fracturing his skull. He was rushed to hospital but died in the early hours of 2 February. He was only 31 years old.

References

1925 births
1957 deaths
British speedway riders
English motorcycle racers
Motorcycle racers who died while racing
Birmingham Brummies riders
Cradley Heathens riders
Sportspeople from Birmingham, West Midlands